Oxycanus hildae is a moth of the family Hepialidae found in New South Wales and Victoria.

References

Moths described in 1964
Hepialidae
Endemic fauna of Australia